Heonjong may refer to:

Heonjong of Goryeo, Korean king, r. 1094–1095
Heonjong of Joseon, Korean king, r. 1834–1849

Temple name disambiguation pages